Rozanna "Roz" Purcell (born 3 September 1990) is an Irish model, charity worker and beauty pageant titleholder who won Miss Universe Ireland 2010 and represented Ireland at Miss Universe 2010.

Miss Universe

Rozanna Purcell competed in Miss Universe Ireland 2009 and competed in Miss Universe 2010.

After Miss Universe

Purcell was offered a contract with Trump Model Management after the Miss Universe 2010 competition ended, and was offered additional contracts in Mexico and Colombia. She was then invited to judge at the Miss Venezuela 2010 pageant. She later joined her mentor Andrea Roche's modelling agency in Ireland.

She has talked of her difficulties at temperatures of minus 25C on Kilimanjaro.

She was a judge at Miss Universe Ireland 2012.

She published her first cookbook Natural Born Feeder in January 2016.

Television work

She won Come Dine With Me on TV3 in 2012.

She participated in Celebrity Bainisteoir on RTÉ in 2012. She managed Newtown Cashel, in Longford.

She has modelled extensively for Newbridge Silverware and is one of the faces of Newbridge Silverware.

In February 2015 she appeared as the guest Celebrity Chef on TV3's The Restaurant.

In 2021, Roz joined the judging panel of recycled fashion programme Junk Kouture alongside esteemed talent manager Louis Walsh and star of RuPaul's Drag Race, Michelle Visage.

Charity work
She has worked with the Children's Hospital of Ecuador.

She has also helped to raise awareness and funds for the Irish Cancer Society's 'Get Active For 2015' campaign.

Personal life
Purcell dated Irish musician Niall Breslin from 2013, although they announced the relationship had ended in April 2016.
In October 2013, she started her own food blog, naturalbornfeeder.com, and planned to publish her first cookbook in December 2015.

References

External links
 Miss Universe Official website

1990 births
Living people
Irish female models
Miss Universe 2010 contestants
Miss Universe Ireland winners
Participants in Irish reality television series
People from Clonmel
Reality show winners
Place of birth missing (living people)
Beauty pageant contestants from Ireland